Wildpark may refer to:

Wildparkstadion, a sports arena in Karlsruhe, Germany
Wildpark, Derbyshire

de:Wildpark